Rajaji is a 1999 Bollywood comedy film produced and directed by Vimal Kumar and starring Govinda and Raveena Tandon. The film is the number 38 grosser of the year amongst Hindi films. The film is a rough remake of the 1982 Rakesh Roshan film Kaamchor.

Plot
Shivnath (Kadar Khan), his wife Parvati (Aruna Irani) and son Rajaji (Govinda) live in a village. Parvati favoured her son a lot, against the wishes of her husband. Raja is lazy and wants to have an easy life. He thinks that if he marries a rich woman, then he will not have to work. Rajaji hence goes with his uncle Shadilal (Satish Kaushik) to Mumbai to find a rich girl.

In Mumbai, Rajaji sees Payal (Raveena Tandon) in a fancy car that drives into a large estate. He assumes that Payal must be very rich and gets into a relationship with her. After wedding, Rajaji realises that Payal was not rich and that she is the daughter of the estate's loyal gardener Pratap Singh (Mohan Joshi). Rajaji angrily denounces his wife and father-in-law and runs away from Mumbai, back to his home where his parents including his mother reject him. He then returns to his wife and tries to apologise but his father in law forces him to leave after ridiculing him by offering him money as he has won the lottery and is now wealthy. Dejected, Rajaji begins working in the factory of Dhanpat Rai the previous employer of Singh and learns the value of hard work and becomes an honest and hardworking man. Eventually he wins back both his wife and father in law and earns the respect of his parents once again by becoming a better man.

Cast
The following is the main cast list of the movie.

Soundtrack
The movie featured 8 songs. Music was by Anand–Milind & Vishwajeet Mukherjee and lyrics were by Sameer.

References

External links
 

1990s Hindi-language films
1999 films
Films scored by Anand–Milind
Remakes of Indian films
Films directed by Vimal Kumar